NS17, NS 17, NS-17, NS.17, or variation, may refer to:

Places
 Bishan MRT station (station code: NS17), Bishan, Singapore; a mass transit station
 Dartmouth North (constituency N.S. 17), Nova Scotia, Canada; a provincial electoral district
 Saramacca District (FIPS region code NS17), Suriname

Other uses
 Norfolk Southern NS17, a preserved sleeper railcar at the Southeastern Railway Museum
 Blue Origin NS-17, a 2021 August 25 suborbital spaceflight by the New Shepard
 New Penguin Shakespeare volume 17

See also

 NS (disambiguation)
 17 (disambiguation)